Lars-Göran Birger Nilsson (born 9 March 1944) is a retired professional ice hockey player who played in the Elitserien for Brynäs IF.

He placed fourth with the Sweden men's national ice hockey team at the 1968 and 1972 Winter Olympics. He played all 13 games (7 in 1968 and 6 in 1972) and scored two goals at each Games. He was a member of the Swedish 1976 Canada Cup team.

References

External links

Lars-Göran Nilsson Biography and Statistics – Olympics at Sports-Reference.com

1944 births
Living people
Brynäs IF players
People from Jokkmokk Municipality
Swedish ice hockey left wingers
Ice hockey players at the 1968 Winter Olympics
Ice hockey players at the 1972 Winter Olympics
Olympic ice hockey players of Sweden
Sportspeople from Norrbotten County